Ri Yong-myong (born 27 July 1998) is a Korean handball player for the Korean national team.

He represented Korea at the 2019 World Men's Handball Championship.

References

1998 births
Living people
Korean male handball players